Arnold Franchetti (1911–1993) was a composer born in Lucca, Italy who later emigrated to the United States.

Early life

As a boy, Franchetti studied composition and piano with his father, Baron Alberto Franchetti (1860–1942). Baron Franchetti was a wealthy, well-respected and successful composer of the operas often performed at La Scala including Germania (performed by Enrico Caruso, conducted by Arturo Toscanini) and Christoforo  Colombo. 

Arnold Franchetti studied physics at the University of Florence, music at the Salzburg Mozarteum, and then moved to Munich from 1937 to 1939, where he studied composition and orchestration with composer Richard Strauss. After a brief stint with the Italian army during World War II, Franchetti joined the anti-Mussolini underground resistance in the Italian Alps where he helped Allied airmen escape.

In the USA

Franchetti emigrated to the US in 1947.  He was befriended by Aaron Copland, who helped the young immigrant composer gain a professional footing by arranging performances of Franchetti's chamber music in Boston, New York City, Philadelphia, and Washington, D.C.  Franchetti took a position at the Hartt School of Music, Hartford, Connecticut, in 1948, where he became chair of the theory and composition department, remaining there until his retirement in 1979. Franchetti's composition students have included: Barbara Kolb, Michael Schelle, Joel Pelletier, Robert Beaser, Jonathan Kramer, Martin Bresnick, film composers Jack Elliott, Ed Alton and Marcus Barone, Robert Lombardo, Henry Gwiazda, Norman Dinerstein, Gwynneth Van Anden Walker, Lee T. McQuillan and many others.

During his 45 years in the United States, Franchetti received composition honors and awards from the Guggenheim Foundation, the National Endowment for the Arts, National Institute of Arts and Letters, and many other prestigious organizations.

He died on March 7, 1993, at Middlesex Hospital in Cromwell, Connecticut.

Compositions

In his early works, Franchetti experimented with late Romantic and neoclassical styles, but he then developed what Imanuel Willheim called "a non-serial, 12-note compositional language featuring primarily diatonic motivic material".

Franchetti composed music in all genres including orchestral, symphonic, chamber and solo music (including five piano sonatas, significant works that have been analyzed in multiple doctoral dissertations).

Franchetti composed numerous theatre works including the opera, Married Men Go to Hell (1974) and the genre-bending Dracula 1979. Another important Franchetti theatrical work is Lazarus (for narrator and symphonic wind ensemble) based on the book Soul on Ice by 1960's Black Panther activist Eldridge Cleaver.

References

1911 births
1993 deaths
Musicians from Lucca
University of Florence alumni
Italian emigrants to the United States
University of Hartford Hartt School faculty
Franchetti family
American male composers

Italian male composers
20th-century American composers
20th-century Italian composers
20th-century Italian musicians
20th-century American male musicians